The 2000 Montreal Expos season was the 32nd season in franchise history.

Offseason
February 4, 2000: Charlie O'Brien was signed as a free agent with the Montreal Expos.
March 17, 2000: Ted Lilly was sent by the Montreal Expos to the New York Yankees to complete an earlier deal made on December 22, 1999. The Montreal Expos sent players to be named later and Jake Westbrook to the New York Yankees for Hideki Irabu. The Montreal Expos sent Ted Lilly (March 17, 2000) and Christian Parker (March 22, 2000) to the New York Yankees to complete the trade.

Spring training
In 2000, the Expos held spring training at Roger Dean Stadium in Jupiter, Florida, a facility they shared with the St. Louis Cardinals. It was their third season there.

Regular season

Opening Day starters

Season standings

Record vs. opponents

Notable transactions
 June 5, 2000: Grady Sizemore was drafted by the Montreal Expos in the 3rd round of the 2000 amateur draft. Player signed June 16, 2000.
 June 5, 2000: Cliff Lee was drafted by the Montreal Expos in the 4th round of the 2000 amateur draft. Player signed July 6, 2000.
June 5, 2000: Jason Bay was drafted by the Montreal Expos in the 22nd round of the 2000 amateur draft. Player signed June 16, 2000.
June 22, 2000: Charlie O'Brien was released by the Montreal Expos.
September 28, 2000: Terrmel Sledge was sent by the Seattle Mariners to the Montreal Expos to complete an earlier deal made on August 8, 2000. The Seattle Mariners sent players to be named later to the Montreal Expos for players to be named later and Chris Widger. The Seattle Mariners sent Sean Spencer (August 10, 2000) and Terrmel Sledge (September 28, 2000) to the Montreal Expos to complete the trade.

Roster

Game log

|- align="center" bgcolor="ffbbbb"
| 1 || April 3 || Dodgers || 4–10 || Brown (1–0) || Hermanson (0–1) || Adams (1) || 51,249 || 0–1
|- align="center" bgcolor="ffbbbb"
| 2 || April 4 || Dodgers || 4–10 || Park (1–0) || Irabu (0–1) || — || 12,143 || 0–2
|- align="center" bgcolor="bbffbb"
| 3 || April 5 || Dodgers || 6–5 || Telford (1–0) || Shaw (0–1) || — || 8,867 || 1–2
|- align="center" bgcolor="bbffbb"
| 4 || April 6 || Dodgers || 11–3 || Pavano (1–0) || Pérez (0–1) || — || 9,121 || 2–2
|- align="center" bgcolor="ffbbbb"
| 5 ||  April 7 || Padres || 5–10 || Meadows (1–0) || Powell (0–1) || — || 12,260 || 2–3
|- align="center" bgcolor="bbffbb"
| 6 ||  April 8 || Padres || 10–9 || Telford (2–0) || Wall (0–1) || Urbina (1) || 13,528 || 3–3
|- align="center" bgcolor="bbffbb"
| 7 ||  April 9 || Padres || 2–1 || Irabu (1–1) || Boehringer (0–1) || Urbina (2) || 9,782 || 4–3
|- align="center" bgcolor="bbffbb"
| 8 ||  April 11 || @ Pirates || 7–3 || Vázquez (1–0) || Benson (0–2) || Kline (1) || 11,335 || 5–3 
|- align="center" bgcolor="ffbbbb"
| 9 ||  April 12 || @ Pirates || 4–6 || Silva (1–0) || Batista (0–1) || Williams (1) || 10,290 || 5–4
|- align="center" bgcolor="ffbbbb"
| 10 || April 13 || @ Pirates || 3–4 || Silva (2–0)  || Urbina (0–1) || — || 11,162 || 5–5
|- align="center" bgcolor="bbffbb"
| 11 || April 14 || @ Phillies || 4–0 || Hermanson (1–1) || Brock (0–2) || — || 12,366 || 6–5
|- align="center" bgcolor="bbbbbb"
| — || April 15 || @ Phillies || colspan=6 | Postponed (rain): Rescheduled for September 11.
|- align="center" bgcolor="ffbbbb"
| 12 || April 16 || @ Phillies || 4–5 || Aldred (1–1) || Telford (1–2) || — || 18,648 || 6–6
|- align="center" bgcolor="bbbbbb"
| — || April 17 || @ Phillies || colspan=6 | Postponed (rain): Rescheduled for September 11 as part of a doubleheader.
|- align="center" bgcolor="bbffbb"
| 13 || April 18 || Cubs || 4–3 || Strickland (1–0) || Tapani (0–2) || Urbina (3) || 9,975 || 7–6
|- align="center" bgcolor="bbffbb"
| 14 || April 19 || Cubs || 7–3 || Pavano (2–0) || Quevedo (0–2) || — || 10,112 || 8–6
|- align="center" bgcolor="ffbbbb"
| 15 || April 20 || Cubs || 6–10 ||  Williams (1–0) || Blank (0–1) || — || 12,186 || 8–7
|- align="center" bgcolor="bbffbb"
| 16 || April 21 || Brewers || 5–1 || Hermanson (2–1) || Haynes (2–1) || Urbina (4) || 12,315 || 9–7
|- align="center" bgcolor="ffbbbb"
| 17 || April 22 || Brewers || 3–7 || Stull (1–1) || Irabu (1–2) || — || 14,461 || 9–8
|- align="center" bgcolor="bbffbb"
| 18 || April 23 || Brewers || 6–4 || Vázquez (2–0) || Navarro (0–4) || Urbina (5) || 14,410 || 10–8
|- align="center" bgcolor="bbffbb"
| 19 || April 25 || Rockies || 10–4 || Pavano (3–0) || Bohanon (0–2) || — || 10,019 || 11–8 
|- align="center" bgcolor="bbffbb"
| 20 || April 26 || Rockies || 9–2 || Hermanson (3–1) || Jarvis (1–1) || Urbina (6) || 10,735 || 12–8
|- align="center" bgcolor="bbffbb"
| 21 || April 28 || @ Giants || 9–3 || Telford (3–1) || Ortiz (2–3) || — || 40,930 || 13–8
|- align="center" bgcolor="ffbbbb"
| 22 || April 29 || @ Giants || 1–2 || Johnstone (2–1) || Telford (3–2) || Nen (4) || 40,930 || 13–9
|- align="center" bgcolor="bbffbb"
| 23 || April 30 || @ Giants || 4–3 || Strickland (2–0)  || Johnstone (2–2) || Urbina (7) || 40,930 || 14–9
|-

|- align="center" bgcolor="ffbbbb"
| 24 || May 1 || @ Rockies || 8–15  || White (1–0) || Hermanson (3–2) || — || 35,104 || 14–10
|- align="center" bgcolor="ffbbbb"
| 25 || May 2 || @ Rockies || 6–12 || Karl (1–2) || Powell (0–2) || — || 39,132 || 14–11
|- align="center" bgcolor="ffbbbb"
| 26 || May 3 ||  @ Rockies || 7–16 || Astacio (3–2) || Irabu (1–3) || — || 40,096 || 14–12
|- align="center" bgcolor="bbffbb"
| 27 || May 5 || @ Brewers || 10–2 || Vázquez (3–0) || Bere (2–3) || — || 10,002 || 15–12
|- align="center" bgcolor="bbffbb"
| 28 || May 6 || @ Brewers || 3–2 || Telford (4–2) || Weathers (2–1) || Urbina (8) || 12,381 || 16–12
|- align="center" bgcolor="ffbbbb"
| 29 || May 7 || @ Brewers || 4–9 || Haynes (4–2) || Hermanson (3–3) || — || 11,989 || 16–13
|- align="center" bgcolor="bbbbbb"
| — || May 8 || Phillies || colspan=6 | Postponed (rain): Rescheduled for May 11.
|- align="center" bgcolor="bbffbb"
| 30 || May 9 || Phillies || 3–2 (10) || Kline (1–0) || Gomes (1–3) || — || 8,845 || 17–13
|- align="center" bgcolor="ffbbbb"
| 31 || May 10 || Phillies || 0–8 || Person (3–1) || Vázquez (3–1) || — || 9,411 || 17–14
|- align="center" bgcolor="ffbbbb"
| 32 || May 11 || Phillies || 4–6 || Wolf (2–2) || Pavano (3–1) || Gomes (6) || 8,311 || 17–15
|- align="center" bgcolor="bbffbb"
| 33 || May 12 || Cubs || 8–3 || Thurman (1–0) || Wood (1–2) || Hermanson (1) || 15,626 || 18–15
|- align="center" bgcolor="ffbbbb" 
| 34 || May 13 || Cubs || 1–2 || Lieber (4–2) || Armas (0–1) || — || 14,321 || 18–16
|- align="center" bgcolor="bbffbb"
| 35 || May 14 || Cubs || 16–15 || Hermanson (4–3) || Aguilera (1–1) || — || 10,621 || 19–16
|- align="center" bgcolor="bbffbb"
| 36 || May 16 || Diamondbacks || 2–0 || Vázquez (4–1) || Johnson (7–1) || Hermanson (2) || 11,898 || 20–16
|- align="center" bgcolor="bbffbb"
| 37 || May 17 || Diamondbacks || 10–2 || Pavano (4–1) || Reynoso (2–4) || — || 8,766 || 21–16
|- align="center" bgcolor="ffbbbb"
| 38 || May 18 || Diamondbacks || 6–8 || Kim (2–1) || Telford (4–3) || — || 11,073 || 21–17
|- align="center" bgcolor="bbffbb"
| 39 || May 19 || Astros || 3–2 || Hermanson (5–3) || Slusarski (0–1) || — || 12,679 || 22–17
|- align="center" bgcolor="bbffbb"
| 40 || May 20 || Astros || 8–7 || Irabu (2–3) || Elarton (2–1) || Hermanson (3) || 15,166 || 23–17
|- align="center" bgcolor="bbffbb"
| 41 || May 21 ||Astros  || 8–3 ||  Vázquez (5–1) || Lima (1–7) || — || 20,111 || 24–17
|- align="center" bgcolor="bbffbb"
| 42 || May 23 || @ Giants || 3–2 || Pavano (5–1) || Rueter (2–3) || Hermanson (4) || 40,930 || 25–17
|- align="center" bgcolor="ffbbbb"
| 43 || May 24 || @ Giants || 0–18 || Estes (3–2) || Thurman (1–1) || — || 40,930 || 25–18
|- align="center" bgcolor="ffbbbb"
| 44 || May 25 || @ Giants || 1–4 || Hernández (3–5) || Armas (0–2) || Nen (7) || 40,930 || 25–19
|- align="center" bgcolor="ffbbbb"
| 45 || May 26 || @ Padres || 2–6 || Whiteside (2–0) || Irabu (2–4) || — || 19,517 || 25–20
|- align="center" bgcolor="ffbbbb"
| 46 || May 27 || @ Padres || 2–4 || Wall (2–2) || Kline (1–1) || Hoffman (10) || 40,110 || 25–21
|- align="center" bgcolor="ffbbbb"
| 47 || May 28 || @ Padres || 3–4 || Walker (1–0) || Pavano (5–2)  || Hoffman (11) || 26,411 || 25–22
|- align="center" bgcolor="ffbbbb"
| 48 || May 30 || @ Reds || 2–4 || Fernández (2–0) || Armas (0–3) || Williamson (6) || 20,250 || 25–23
|- align="center" bgcolor="bbffbb"
| 49 || May 31 || @ Reds || 10–4 || Johnson (1–0) || Parris (2–7) || — || 21,207 || 26–23
|-

|- align="center" bgcolor="bbffbb"
| 50 || June 1 || @ Reds || 9–7 || Vázquez (6–1) || Villone (6–2) || Kline (2) || 23,099 || 27–23 
|- align="center" bgcolor="bbffbb"
| 51 || June 2 || Orioles || 5–3 || Pavano (6–2) || Johnson (0–4) || Kline (3) || 12,654 || 28–23
|- align="center" bgcolor="bbffbb"
| 52 || June 3 || Orioles || 7–4 || Lira (1–0) || Rapp (4–3) || Kline (4) ||  13,628 || 29–23
|- align="center" bgcolor="bbffbb"
| 53 || June 4 || Orioles || 1–0 || Armas (1–3) || Ponson (3–3) || Kline (5) || 15,181 || 30–23
|- align="center" bgcolor="bbffbb"
| 54 || June 5 || Yankees || 6–4 || Johnson (2–0) || Cone  (1–6) || Kline (6) || 18,095 || 31–23
|- align="center" bgcolor="ffbbbb"
| 55 || June 6 || Yankees || 1–8  || Grimsley (2–1) || Vázquez (6–2) || — ||  24,453 || 31–24
|- align="center" bgcolor="ffbbbb"
| 56 || June 7 || Yankees || 2–7 || Hernández (6–4) || Pavano (6–3) || — || 25,381 || 31–25
|- align="center" bgcolor="ffbbbb"
| 57 || June 9 || @ Blue Jays || 3–13 || Carpenter (5–5) || Tucker (0–1) || — || 26,122 || 31–26
|- align="center" bgcolor="bbffbb"
| 58 || June 10 || @ Blue Jays || 11–2 || Armas (2–3) || Escobar (5–7) || — || 30,239 || 32–26
|- align="center" bgcolor="ffbbbb"
| 59 || June 11 || @ Blue Jays  || 3–8 || Koch (4–1) || Mota (0–1) || — || 25,838 || 32–27
|- align="center" bgcolor="ffbbbb"
| 60 || June 12 || @ Brewers || 1–8 || Bere (4–5) || Vázquez (6–3) || — || 16,686 || 32–28
|- align="center" bgcolor="bbffbb"
| 61 || June 13 || @ Brewers || 9–4 || Pavano (7–3) || Woodard (1–5) || — || 10,705 || 33–28
|- align="center" bgcolor="ffbbbb"
| 62 || June 14 || @ Brewers || 2–11 || Wright (2–1) || Johnson (2–1) || — || 12,875 || 33–29
|- align="center" bgcolor="ffbbbb"
| 63 || June 16 || @ Cubs || 8–9 || Van Poppel (2–2) || Armas (2–4) || Aguilera (14) || 38,010 || 33–30
|- align="center" bgcolor="ffbbbb"
| 64 || June 17 || @ Cubs || 0–1 || Rain (1–0) || Hermanson (5–4) || Aguilera (15) || 39,502 || 33–31
|- align="center" bgcolor="bbffbb"
| 65 || June 18 || @ Cubs || 4–3 (11) || Telford (5–3) || Garibay (1–3) || Rigby (2) || 38,752 || 34–31
|- align="center" bgcolor="bbffbb"
| 66 || June 19 || Pirates || 2–1 || Pavano (8–3) || Loiselle (0–2) || Kline (7) || 7,483 || 35–31
|- align="center" bgcolor="ffbbbb"
| 67 || June 20 || Pirates || 1–2 || Benson (6–5)  ||  Johnson (2–2) || Williams (10) || 8,056 || 35–32
|- align="center" bgcolor="ffbbbb"
| 68 || June 21 || Pirates || 3–8 || Córdova (5–5) || Armas (2–5) || Peters (1) || 8,324 || 35–33
|- align="center" bgcolor="bbffbb"
| 69 || June 22 || Pirates || 6–5 || Hermanson (6–4) || Ritchie (4–4) || Telford (2) || 8,635 || 36–33
|- align="center" bgcolor="ffbbbb"
| 70 || June 23 || Phillies || 6–13 || Coggin (1–0) || Vázquez (6–4) || — || 8,197 || 36–34
|- align="center" bgcolor="ffbbbb"
| 71 || June 24 || Phillies || 1–8 || Wolf (7–4) || Pavano (8–4) || — || 8,374 || 36–35
|- align="center" bgcolor="bbffbb"
| 72 || June 25 || Phillies || 3–1 || Johnson (3–2) || Byrd (1–6) || Kline (8) || 13,164 || 37–35
|- align="center" bgcolor="bbffbb"
| 73 || June 27 || Braves || 6–4 || Armas (3–5) || Glavine (7–5) || Kline (9) || 11,636 || 38–35
|- align="center" bgcolor="ffbbbb"
| 74 || June 28 || Braves || 4–7 || Mulholland (8–6) || Hermanson (6–5) || Ligtenberg (5) || 12,653 || 38–36
|- align="center" bgcolor="ffbbbb"
| 75 || June 30 || Marlins || 4–5 || Almanza (1–0) || Kline (1–2) || Alfonseca (23) || 8,047 || 38–37
|-

|- align="center" bgcolor="ffbbbb"
| 76 || July 1 || Marlins || 5–6  || Dempster (9–4) || Johnson (3–3) || Alfonseca (24) || 8,529 || 38–38
|- align="center" bgcolor="ffbbbb"
| 77 || July 2 || Marlins || 1–2 || Cornelius (3–2) || Santana (0–1) || Alfonseca (25) || 9,076 || 38–39
|- align="center" bgcolor="bbffbb"
| 78 || July 3 || @ Braves || 17–1 || Armas (4–5) || Mulhollandl (8–8) || — || 44,302 || 39–39
|- align="center" bgcolor="ffbbbb"
| 79 || July 4 || @ Braves || 3–7 || Maddux (10–3) || Hermanson (6–6) || — || 47,277 || 39–40
|- align="center" bgcolor="bbffbb"
| 80 || July 5 || @ Braves || 6–5 || Vázquez (7–4) || Millwood  (5–7) || Kline (10) || 34,044 || 40–40
|- align="center" bgcolor="bbffbb"
| 81 || July 6 || @ Braves || 4–2 || Johnson (4–3) || Burkett (6–4) || Kline (11) || 36,377 || 41–40
|- align="center" bgcolor="bbffbb"
| 82 || July 7 || Blue Jays || 10–5 || Lira (2–0) || Quantrill (0–5) || — || 13,317 || 42–40
|- align="center" bgcolor="ffbbbb"
| 83 || July 8 || Blue Jays || 3–6 || Wells (15–2) || Armas (4–6) || Koch (20) || 17,420 || 42–41
|- align="center" bgcolor="ffbbbb"
| 84 || July 9 || Blue Jays || 3–13 || Castillo (6–5) || Hermanson (6–7) || — || 22,489 || 42–42
|- style="text-align:center; background:#bbb;"
|colspan=9| All–Star Break (July 10–12)
|- align="center" bgcolor="ffbbbb"
| 85 || July 13 || @ Devil Rays || 4–6 || Mecir (7–1) || Lira (2–1) || Hernández (13) || 14,924 || 42–43
|- align="center" bgcolor="ffbbbb"
| 86 || July 14 || @ Devil Rays || 5–8 || Lopez (6–6) || Armas (4–7) || Hernández (14) || 15,870 || 42–44
|- align="center" bgcolor="bbffbb"
| 87 || July 15 || @ Devil Rays || 4–1 || Hermanson (7–7) || Trachsel (6–9) || Kline (12) || 19,366 || 43–44
|- align="center" bgcolor="ffbbbb"
| 88 || July 16 || @ Red Sox || 2–5 || Wakefield (6–5) || Johnson (4–4) || Wasdin (1) || 32,164 || 43–45
|- align="center" bgcolor="ffbbbb"
| 89 || July 17 || @ Red Sox || 3–7 || Pichardo (4–1) || Telford (5–4) || — || 32,703 || 43–46
|- align="center" bgcolor="ffbbbb"
| 90 || July 18 || @ Red Sox || 1–3 || Martínez (9–4) || Vázquez (7–5) || Lowe (21) || 32,629 || 43–47
|- align="center" bgcolor="ffbbbb"
| 91 || July 19 || Mets || 3–5 || Mahomes (4–1) || Kline (1–3) || Benítez (22) || 14,198 || 43–48
|- align="center" bgcolor="bbffbb"
| 92 || July 20 || Mets || 4–1 || Hermanson (8–7) || Hampton (9–7) || Strickland (1) || 13,348 || 44–48
|- align="center" bgcolor="bbffbb"
| 93 || July 21 || @ Marlins || 7–3 || Thurman (2–1) || Smith (0–3) || — || 11,234 || 45–48
|- align="center" bgcolor="bbffbb"
| 94 || July 22 || @ Marlins || 17–7 || Johnson (5–4) || Cornelius (3–4) || — || 15,476 || 46–48
|- align="center" bgcolor="bbffbb"
| 95 || July 23 || @ Marlins || 7–6 || Vázquez (8–5) || Sánchez (6–8) || Strickland (2) || 11,307 || 47–48
|- align="center" bgcolor="ffbbbb"
| 96 || July 25 || @ Mets || 0–5 || Rusch (7–7) || Hermanson (8–8) || — || 41,028 || 47–49
|- align="center" bgcolor="bbbbbb"
| — || July 26 || @ Mets || colspan=6 | Postponed (rain): Rescheduled for July 27 as part of a doubleheader.
|- align="center" bgcolor="ffbbbb"
| 97 || July 27 (1) || @ Mets || 8–9 || Franco (5–3) || Strickland (2–1) || Benítez (23) || rowspan=2| 35,088 || 47–50
|- align="center" bgcolor="ffbbbb"
| 98 || July 27 (2) || @ Mets || 3–4 || Hampton (10–7) || Irabu (2–5) || — || 47–51
|- align="center" bgcolor="ffbbbb"
| 99 || July 28 || Reds || 3–8 || Dessens (5–0) || Johnson (5–5) || — || 11,547 || 47–52
|- align="center" bgcolor="ffbbbb"
| 100 || July 29 || Reds || 3–4 (11) || Graves (10–0) || Santana (0–2) || — || 13,577 || 47–53
|- align="center" bgcolor="ffbbbb"
| 101 || July 30 || Reds || 4–7 || Bell (5–6) || Hermanson (8–9) || Graves (18) || 14,495 || 47–54
|- align="center" bgcolor="ffbbbb"
| 102 || July 31 || Cardinals || 0–4 || Kile (13–6) || Thurman (2–2) || — || 9,558 || 47–55
|-

|- align="center" bgcolor="bbffbb"
| 103 || August 1 || Cardinals  || 4–0 || Moore (1–0) || Ankiel (7–7) || — || 9,818 || 48–55
|- align="center" bgcolor="ffbbbb"
| 104 || August 2 || Cardinals  || 7–10 || Hentgen (10–8) || Johnson (5–6) || — || 9,669 || 48–56
|- align="center" bgcolor="ffbbbb"
| 105 || August 4 || @ Astros || 6–7 || Green (1–0) ||  Kline (1–4) || Dotel (5) || 38,502 || 48–57
|- align="center" bgcolor="bbffbb"
| 106 || August 5 ||  @ Astros || 10–9 || Strickland (3–1) || Valdes (2–4) || Kline (13) || 42,399 || 49–57
|- align="center" bgcolor="ffbbbb"
| 107 || August 6 ||  @ Astros || 1–8 || Elarton (12–4) || Thurman (2–3) || — || 36,882 || 49–58
|- align="center" bgcolor="ffbbbb"
| 108 || August 7 || @ Diamondbacks || 2–5 || Schilling (9–6) || Moore (1–1) || — || 31,526 || 49–59
|- align="center" bgcolor="bbffbb"
| 109 || August 8 || @ Diamondbacks || 9–3 || Lira (3–1) || Anderson (9–5) || — || 33,113 || 50–59
|- align="center" bgcolor="bbffbb"
| 110 || August 9 || @ Diamondbacks || 4–3 || Strickland (4–1) || Guzmán (4–4) || Telford (2) ||  33,500 || 51–59
|- align="center" bgcolor="ffbbbb"
| 111 || August 11 || Rockies || 3–10 || Bohanon (6–8) || Hermanson (8–10) || — || 9,136 || 51–60
|- align="center" bgcolor="ffbbbb"
| 112 || August 12 || Rockies || 2–14 || Yoshii (5–12) || Moore (1–2) || — || 9,815 || 51–61
|- align="center" bgcolor="ffbbbb"
| 113 || August 13 || Rockies || 3–5 || Chouinard (1–1) || Strickland (4–2) || White (3) || 10,606 || 51–62
|- align="center" bgcolor="ffbbbb"
| 114 || August 14 || Rockies || 3–4 || House (1–0) || Strickland (4–3) || Jiménez (16) || 6,924 || 51–63
|- align="center" bgcolor="ffbbbb"
| 115 || August 15 || Giants || 7–9 || del Toro (1–0) || Lira (3–2) || Nen (29) || 7,165 || 51–64
|- align="center" bgcolor="ffbbbb"
| 116 || August 16 || Giants || 1–4 || Gardner (8–6) || Hermanson (8–11) || Nen (30) || 7,910 || 51–65
|- align="center" bgcolor="ffbbbb"
| 117 || August 17 || Giants || 4–5 || Estes (12–3) || Moore (1–3) || Rodríguez (3) || 9,198 || 51–66
|- align="center" bgcolor="bbffbb"
| 118 || August 18 || @ Padres || 6–3 || Thurman (3–3) ||  Clement (11–11) || Strickland (3) || 20,597 || 52–66
|- align="center" bgcolor="ffbbbb"
| 119 || August 19 || @ Padres || 3–4 (11) || Walker (7–1) || Santana (0–3) || — || 56,779 || 52–67
|- align="center" bgcolor="ffbbbb"
| 120 || August 20 || @ Padres || 4–5 || Witasick (4–9) || Lira (3–3) || Hoffman (34) || 25,343 || 52–68
|- align="center" bgcolor="bbffbb"
| 121 || August 21 || @ Dodgers || 4–1 || Hermanson (9–11) || Herges (8–3) || Strickland (4) || 32,053 || 53–68
|- align="center" bgcolor="ffbbbb"
| 122 || August 22 || @ Dodgers || 6–14 ||  Adams (6–6) || Santana (0–4) || — || 29,804 || 53–69
|- align="center" bgcolor="ffbbbb"
| 123 || August 23 || @ Dodgers || 1–5 || Brown (11–5) || Thurman (3–4) || — ||  31,337 || 53–70
|- align="center" bgcolor="ffbbbb"
| 124 || August 24 || @ Dodgers || 0–7 || Park (13–8) || Vázquez (8–6) || — || 28,896 || 53–71
|- align="center" bgcolor="ffbbbb"
| 125 || August 25 || Astros || 1–3 || Holt (6–12) || Lira (3–4) || Dotel (10) || 7,636 || 53–72
|- align="center" bgcolor="bbffbb"
| 126 || August 26 || Astros || 5–4 || Hermanson (10–11) || Lima (5–15) || Kline (14) || 8,619 || 54–72
|- align="center" bgcolor="ffbbbb"
| 127 || August 27 || Astros || 3–7 || Elarton (15–4) || Moore (1–4) || — || 10,732 || 54–73
|- align="center" bgcolor="bbffbb"
| 128 || August 28 || Diamondbacks || 9–5 || Thurman (4–4) || Schilling (10–9) || Telford (3) || 6,389 || 55–73
|- align="center" bgcolor="ffbbbb"
| 129 || August 29 || Diamondbacks || 7–8 || Plesac (4–4) || Forster (0–1) || Mesa (11) || 6,029 || 55–74
|- align="center" bgcolor="ffbbbb"
| 130 || August 30 || Diamondbacks || 0–7 || Johnson (17–5) || Lira (3–5) || — || 7,650 || 55–75
|-

|- align="center" bgcolor="ffbbbb"
| 131 || September 1 || @ Reds || 2–8 || Bell (6–7) || Hermanson (10–12) || — || 22,973 || 55–76
|- align="center" bgcolor="bbffbb"
| 132 || September 2 || @ Reds || 9–5 || Lira (4–5) || Villone (9–8) || — || 29,403 || 56–76
|- align="center" bgcolor="ffbbbb"
| 133 || September 3 || @ Reds || 1–8 || Parris (10–14) || Thurman (4–5) || — || 26,152 || 56–77
|- align="center" bgcolor="ffbbbb"
| 134 || September 4 || @ Cardinals || 2–4 || Hentgen (14–12) || Vázquez (8–7) || Veres (25) || 39,704 || 56–78
|- align="center" bgcolor="ffbbbb"
| 135 || September 5 || @ Cardinals || 6–7 || Reames (1–1) || Santana (0–5) || Timlin (12) || 31,821 || 56–79
|- align="center" bgcolor="bbffbb"
| 136 || September 6 ||  @ Cardinals || 7–2 || Hermanson (11–12) || Stephenson (15–8) || — || 30,280 || 57–79
|- align="center" bgcolor="ffbbbb"
| 137 || September 7 ||  @ Cardinals || 1–6 || Kile (17–9) || Armas (4–8) || — || 30,799 || 57–80
|- align="center" bgcolor="ffbbbb"
| 138 || September 8 || @ Braves || 2–3 || Ashby (9–12) || Moore (1–4) || Rocker (20) || 35,870 || 57–81
|- align="center" bgcolor="bbffbb"
| 139 || September 9 || @ Braves || 7–5 (12) ||Santana (1–5) || Seelbach (0–1) || — || 47,775 || 58–81
|- align="center" bgcolor="bbffbb"
| 140 || September 10 || @ Braves || 4–0 || Vázquez (9–7) || Glavine (19–7) || — || 39,068 || 59–81
|- align="center" bgcolor="ffbbbb"
| 141 || September 11 (1) || @ Phillies || 2–5 || Politte (3–2) || Hermanson (11–13) || Brantley (23) || rowspan=2| 11,310 || 59–82
|- align="center" bgcolor="bbffbb"
| 142 || September 11 (2) || @ Phillies || 7–6 || Mota (1–1) || Padilla (1–2) || Strickland (5) || 60–82
|- align="center" bgcolor="bbffbb"
| 143 || September 12 || @ Phillies || 1–0 || Armas (5–8) || Telemaco (1–1) || Strickland (6) || 12,135 || 61–82
|- align="center" bgcolor="ffbbbb"
| 144 || September 13 || @ Phillies || 5–15 || Chen (7–2) || Lira (4–6) || — ||  12,316 || 61–83
|- align="center" bgcolor="ffbbbb"
| 145 || September 14 || Mets || 4–10 || Rusch (10–10) || Thurman (4–6) || — || 6,219 || 61–84
|- align="center" bgcolor="bbffbb"
| 146 || September 15 || Mets || 4–3 || Vázquez (10–7) || Wendell (7–6) || Strickland (7) || 6,979 || 62–84
|- align="center" bgcolor="ffbbbb"
| 147 || September 16 || Mets || 4–10 || Reed (10–5) || Hermanson (11–14) || — ||  9,045 || 62–85
|- align="center" bgcolor="bbffbb"
| 148 || September 17 || Mets || 5–0 || Armas (6–8) || Jones (9–6) || — || 9,349 || 63–85
|- align="center" bgcolor="bbffbb"
| 149 || September 18 || Marlins || 11–4 || Lira (5–6) || Sánchez (9–11) || — || 4,769 || 64–85
|- align="center" bgcolor="ffbbbb"
| 150 || September 19 || Marlins || 1–3 || Dempster (13–10) || Thurman (4–7) ||  Alfonseca (42) || 5,283 || 64–86
|- align="center" bgcolor="bbffbb"
| 151 || September 20 || Marlins || 4–2 || Vázquez (11–7) || Cornelius (3–10) || Strickland (8) || 5,851 || 65–86
|- align="center" bgcolor="bbffbb"
| 152 || September 21 || Marlins || 10–3 || Hermanson (12–14) || Burnett (2–7) || — || 4,801 || 66–86
|- align="center" bgcolor="bbffbb"
| 153 || September 22 || Braves || 6–4 || Armas (7–8) || Millwood (10–12) || Strickland (9) || 8,464 || 67–86
|- align="center" bgcolor="ffbbbb"
| 154 || September 23 || Braves || 0–10 || Maddux (19–8) || Lira (5–7) || — || 10,136 || 67–87
|- align="center" bgcolor="ffbbbb"
| 155 || September 24 || Braves || 5–14 || Ashby (12–12) || Thurman (4–8) || — || 11,350 || 67–88
|- align="center" bgcolor="ffbbbb"
| 156 || September 25 || Braves || 0–6 || Glavine (20–9) || Vázquez (11–8) || — || 6,931 || 67–89
|- align="center" bgcolor="ffbbbb"
| 157 || September 26 || @ Marlins || 4–5 (10) || Alfonseca (5–6) || Kline (1–5) || — || 8,538 || 67–90
|- align="center" bgcolor="ffbbbb"
| 158 || September 27 || @ Marlins || 3–6 || Burnett (3–7) || Armas (7–9) || Alfonseca (43) || 10,269 || 67–91
|- align="center" bgcolor="ffbbbb"
| 159 || September 28 || @ Marlins || 4–7 || Penny (8–7) || Lira (5–8) || Alfonseca (44) || 7,864 || 67–92
|- align="center" bgcolor="ffbbbb"
| 160 || September 29 || @ Mets || 2–11 || Hampton (15–10) || Thurman (4–9) || — || 28,788 || 67–93
|- align="center" bgcolor="ffbbbb"
| 161 || September 30 ||@ Mets || 2–4 || Wendell (8–6) || Vázquez (11–9) || Benítez (41) || 39,468 || 67–94
|-

|- align="center" bgcolor="ffbbbb"
| 162 || October 1 || @ Mets || 2–3 (13)|| Mahomes (5–3) || Powell (0–3) || — || 44,869 || 67–95
|-

Attendance
The Expos drew 926,272 fans at Olympic Stadium during 2000, placing them 16th in attendance for the season among the 16 National League teams. Their highest attendance at a home game occurred on April 3, when they drew an Opening Day crowd of 51,249 for a game against the Los Angeles Dodgers, while the low mark was 4,769 for a game against the Florida Marlins on September 18.

Player stats

Batting 
Note: Pos = Position; G = Games played; AB = At bats; R = Runs scored; H = Hits; 2B = Doubles; 3B = Triples; HR = Home runs; RBI = Runs batted in; AVG = Batting average; SB = Stolen bases

Complete offensive statistics are available here.

Pitching
Note: Pos = Position; W = Wins; L = Losses; ERA = Earned run average; G = Games pitched; GS = Games started; SV = Saves; IP = Innings pitched; R = Runs allowed; ER = Earned runs allowed; BB = Walks allowed; K = Strikeouts

Complete pitching statistics are available here.

Award winners

2000 Major League Baseball All-Star Game

Farm system

References

 2000 Montreal Expos at Baseball Reference
 2000 Montreal Expos at Baseball Almanac

Montreal Expos seasons
Montreal Expos
2000 in Quebec
2000s in Montreal